Events from the year 1656 in Ireland.

Incumbent
Lord Protector: Oliver Cromwell

Events
Cromwellian soldier William Morris becomes a Quaker, founding a meeting at Belturbet, County Cavan, before returning to his home at Castle Salem, Cork.
William Petty completes the comprehensive mapping of Ireland known as the Down Survey.

Births
April 17 – William Molyneux, natural philosopher and writer, founder of the Dublin Philosophical Society (d.1698).

Deaths
March 21 – James Ussher, Archbishop of Armagh (Church of Ireland) and Primate of All Ireland, published the Ussher chronology purporting to time and date creation (b. 1581)
Approximate date – Sir Dominick Browne, merchant and landowner (b. c.1585)

References

 
1650s in Ireland
Ireland
Years of the 17th century in Ireland